Vrbica is a village southeast of Ilirska Bistrica in the Inner Carniola region of Slovenia.

The small church in the settlement is dedicated to Our Lady of the Snows and belongs to the Parish of Ilirska Bistrica.

References

External links
Vrbica on Geopedia

Populated places in the Municipality of Ilirska Bistrica